Venkatesh Srinivas Kulkarni (1945 – May 3, 1998) was an Indian-American novelist and academic.

Early life and education
Kulkarni was born in India and graduated from university at age 17. He was originally scheduled to go to medical school, but the admissions counselors at the institution asked him to come back when he was older. Kulkarni graduated with a master's degree from Osmania University at the age of 19. He undertook further studies at Cambridge University, the University of Moscow, the University of Heidelberg, the Sorbonne, and Tulane University.

Career
Kulkarni became a Rotary International fellow and came to the United States. A member of the U.S. Cabinet asked Kulkarni to apply for U.S. citizenship.

His first novel, Naked in Deccan (1983), won the 1984 American Book Award of the Before Columbus Foundation and was listed among the top ten novels of the decade by the Chicago Tribune. In the book, Kulkarni describes Deccan, a region of India, as a “landscape lined with stretchmarks of fate masquerading as cart-driven paths deeply embedded in the dark earth”. The story is set in the feudal caste system and has no heroes or villains. Human beings demonstrate weaknesses and passions; some demonstrate moral strength and some do not.

For twelve years until his death, Kulkarni taught creative writing at Rice University in Houston. Kulkarni's students included Kathi Appelt and John Odam.

Death and legacy
In 1997, he had a late diagnosis of leukemia and despite prolonged treatment at the MD Anderson Cancer Center in Houston, died on May 3, 1998. He was survived by his wife, Margaret, and four children: eldest son Sri, next-eldest son Silas, daughter Margo, and youngest son Kris.

He left two unfinished books, Allah Baksh - The Man Eaten By God, and The Modern American Apollo.

A Teaching Prize has been named for him by Rice University.

Awards
 1984 American Book Award for Naked in Deccan

Family
His son, Sri Preston Kulkarni, was the Democratic candidate for Texas's 22nd congressional district in the United States House of Representatives in 2018 and 2020.

Works

References

20th-century American novelists
American male novelists
Writers from Hyderabad, India
1945 births
1998 deaths
Osmania University alumni
American Book Award winners
20th-century American male writers
Novelists from Texas